KEKR (1590 kHz, 99.3 FM "Kicker 99.3") is a commercial AM radio station, paired with an FM relay translator, broadcasting a classic country radio format. Licensed to Mexia, Texas, the station serves the Waco metropolitan area. The station is currently owned by M&M Broadcasters, Ltd. Its studios are in Waco, and its transmitter is located in Mexia.

Translator

History
On May 23, 1956, the station signed on as KBUS. It was owned by Bi-Stone Broadcasting, and was a 500 watt daytimer, required to leave the air after sunset.

On February 29, 2012, the then-KLRK changed its format to adult hits, branded as "101.3 Bob FM", also broadcasting on FM translator K267AI 101.3 FM in Moody, Texas.

On February 28, 2013, KLRK changed its format to Regional Mexican music, branded as "La Caliente."

On April 18, 2014, KLRK changed back to dance hits, branded as "101.3 Party".

On February 3, 2015, KLRK changed its format to adult contemporary music and rebranded as "Mix 101.3".

On August 20, 2016, KLRK switched to a simulcast of adult contemporary-formatted KBHT 104.9 FM in Bellmead. 1590 switched again to adult hits, as "Bob-FM" simultaneously with 104.9 FM. Ironically, 1590 and 104.9 were reunited as a result, having once been independently programmed AM and FM sister stations, owned by the Groveton Family, and still broadcasting from Downtown Mexia.

During the summer of 2018, KLRK began airing the national Fox Sports Radio feed and reimaged as "Fox Sports 1590."

The station changed its call sign to KEKR on November 28, 2019.

On January 19, 2020, KEKR changed their format from sports (which moved to KBHT-HD3) to classic country, branded as "Kicker 99.3".

Previous logo

References

External links

EKR
Radio stations established in 1956
1956 establishments in Texas
Classic country radio stations in the United States